Palm Meadows Thoroughbred Training Center is  an American  stable and training facility for Thoroughbred racehorses located near Boynton Beach, Florida, just north of the Gulfstream Park racetrack. It is owned by Stronach Group. It was built by MI Developments (MID) at a cost of  $90 million. The  center opened in November 2002 and is regarded as one of horse racing's largest and most modern training centers in the United States.

References
 South Florida Business Journal article on the Palm Meadows Thoroughbred Training Center
Magna Entertainments official website for Palm Meadows Thoroughbred Training Center with photographs

Stronach Group
Boynton Beach, Florida
Sports venues in Palm Beach County, Florida
2002 establishments in Florida
Sports venues completed in 2002